Ahmet Yıldız (born 1979 in Sakarya, Turkey) is an American Turkish academic. He is currently a professor of physics and molecular cell biology at the University of California, Berkeley. He has contributed significantly to the understanding of transport within cells, in particular how motor proteins walk along filaments.

He received a B.S. in physics from Boğaziçi University, Istanbul, in 2001, followed by a Ph.D. from the University of Illinois at Urbana–Champaign in 2006. After postdoctoral work with Prof. Ron Vale at UCSF he joined the faculty of University of California, Berkeley in 2008.

In 2003 Yildiz received the Foresight Distinguished Student Award for his study of the motion of the molecular motor myosin V. According to the Foresight Institute: "The Distinguished Student Award recognizes the college graduate or undergraduate student whose work is deemed most notable in advancing the development and understanding of molecular nanotechnology." The award was presented during the Foresight Conference on Molecular Nanotechnology, October 10–12, 2003, in San Francisco. The Foresight Institute Distinguished Student Award was created in 1997, and is awarded annually.

Yildiz was awarded the 2005 GE & Science Prize for Young Life Scientists.

Yildiz currently teaches physics at University of California, Berkeley.

References

External links
 Foresight Award notice
 "Molecular motor Myosin VI moves ’hand over hand’, researchers say" by James E. Kloeppel (accessed 13 January 2003) ("Myosin VI is a molecular motor that walks 'backwards' on filaments of actin.") 
According to Google Scholar, the paper has been cited 1427 times.
 "Myosin V Walks Hand-Over-Hand: Single Fluorophore Imaging with 1.5-nm Localization" by Ahmet Yildiz, Joseph N. Forkey, Sean A. McKinney, Taekjip Ha, Yale E. Goldman, and Paul R. Selvin in Science (27 June 2003: Vol. 300. no. 5628, pp. 2061 – 2065)
 Full PDF version of "Myosin V Walks..." paper
 "Cell's Motor Is a Mountain Climber, Not an Inchworm" Howard Hughes Medical Institute Research news, December 19, 2003.
 "Kinesin Walks Hand-Over-Hand" by Ahmet Yildiz, Michio Tomishige, Ronald D. Vale, and Paul R. Selvin. (Science 30 January 2004: Vol. 303. no. 5658, pp. 676 – 678)
Young Scientist of the year award winner 2006 Turkish scientist's discovery of how proteins work

Turkish scientists
Turkish physicists
Turkish molecular biologists
Turkish academics
Living people
University of California, Berkeley faculty
1979 births
American people of Turkish descent